Omorgus tuberosus is a species of hide beetle in the subfamily Omorginae and subgenus Afromorgus.

References

tuberosus
Beetles described in 1855